Thailand was one of the countries that was hit by the 2004 Indian Ocean earthquake and tsunami. Due to proximity of the Andaman coasts of Thailand situated just about 500 km east of the earthquake epicentre, the tsunami took just 2 hours to reach and strike the western coastline of the country. The Thai government reported 4,812 confirmed deaths, 8,457 injuries, and 4,499 missing after the country was hit by a tsunami caused by the Indian Ocean earthquake on 26 December 2004.

The first location where the tsunami was noticed was on the Similan Islands, a famous diving site located about 70 km from Phang Nga town in Pha Nga province or 13 km from central Khao Lak. The sea around these islands when the tsunami struck was reported to have strong currents and divers underwater felt as though they were in a washing machine. Some flooding also occurred inland, though no casualties were reported.

The popular tourist resort of Phuket was badly hit.  250 people were reported dead, including tourists. The tsunami struck the west coast of Phuket island, flooding and causing damage to almost all the major beaches such as Patong, Karon, Kamala, and Kata beach.

The smaller but increasingly popular resort area of Khao Lak some 80 km north of Phuket was hit far worse with 3,950 confirmed deaths, however, the death toll in Khao Lak may have exceeded 4,500. The severity of the situation in Khao Lak is probably explained by the fact, that unlike the high-rise hotels of Phuket, the village of Khao Lak only had low built bungalows instead of high-rise concrete hotels.

Khao Lak also has an extensive area of flatland only a few meters above the sea level, on which most bungalows were situated. Khao Lak experienced the highest run-up of any tsunami wave height of any location outside Sumatra. Due to the topography of the seabed, coastline and reefs offshore, the tsunami waves piled on top of themselves and in doing so, create the infamous 'disappearing sea effect' which enticed many tourists to their deaths. This effect is also known as the tsunami drawback. Bhumi Jensen, grandson of Thailand's King Bhumibol Adulyadej was among those killed in Khao Lak.

Just north of the Khao Lak area, the village of Ban Nam Khem was the worst affected in terms of devastation to the local population, with around a quarter of its population of 4,200 lost to the tsunami and 80 percent of homes destroyed.

Hundreds of holiday tourists on the Phi Phi Islands were washed out to sea. Tuk-tuk drivers were quick to offer assistance, driving victims to hospitals, higher grounds and away from the surging waters. The nearby Ko Lanta Yai, however, was not afflicted as badly. At some places in Phuket and Phang Nga provinces, elephants were used to move and lift heavy wreckage to search for victims and to clear roads. These included six male Indian elephants which had previously been used in making the movie Alexander. On a beach in Thailand, a man was leading an elephant to entertain tourists, when the tsunami came. The elephant's natural instinct to flee the sea saved the life of a young girl who was upon his back.

Source: Bangkok Post. The "total deaths" and "total injured" categories include dead and injured persons whose nationality is not given or has not been established. The number of "foreign injured" has been reduced by evacuations of foreign nationals. Thai sources acknowledge that the great majority of those listed as "missing" are in fact dead, and that a large majority of these are foreigners.

An article in the Bangkok Post on 10 January suggested that some of the figures in this table may be seriously misleading. According to this article, the estimated number of deaths among Thai nationals has been reduced from about 2,500 to about 1,800, and the estimated number of deaths among foreigners has been reduced from 2,500 to 1,300. The number of deaths whose nationality has not been established has risen correspondingly, from less than 200 to about 2,100. This is due to increasing doubts about the reliability of the classification on the basis of visual identification of badly decomposed bodies into "Thai" and "foreign" categories. All bodies of unknown origin will now be DNA tested to determine their ethnic origin.

Impact

The economic impact of the tsunami on Thailand was considerable, though not as great as in poorer countries such as Indonesia or Sri Lanka. Thailand has a liberalised, flexible and robust economy, which has shown powers of rapid recuperation after previous setbacks. The sectors most badly damaged were tourism and fishing. The beach resorts along the Andaman Sea coast were extensively damaged. Many Thai-owned hotels and other small businesses were ruined, and the Thai government provided large amounts of capital to enable the recovery of the private sector.

Infrastructure in general was, predictably, severely damaged, though much has been gleaned from surveying the aftermath. Reinforced concrete power poles are normally the standard in countries with high seismic risk. Addition of the tsunami's waves and associated debris demonstrated their weakness to shearing at the base. There were revelations about the height of these poles, too – the (up to) 10 meter waves submerged the shorter, older poles. And high-density polyethylene piping was found to perform exceptionally well: as roads crumbled, the subterranean flexible pipelines formed new contours and rarely separated.

The confidence of European tourists in travelling to places such as Phuket also took some time to recover, which is one reason why Thailand strongly backed the installed tsunami warning system. Thousands of Thais dependent on tourism-related industries lost their jobs, not just in the south but also in the poorest part of Thailand, Isan in the north-east, where many workers in the tourism industry come from. By 12 January some of the affected resorts in the south had re-opened, and the Thai government had begun an advertising campaign to bring visitors back to the area as quickly as possible, though everyone knew it would be quite a while before Thailand was in a state of normalcy, professionals guessed around ten years.

The fishing industry was damaged by the extensive destruction of fishing boats and tackle, which individual fishing families could not afford to replace, particularly since many lost their homes as well. According to one report, more than 500 fishing boats and ten trawlers were destroyed, as well as many piers and fish-processing facilities. Again, grants or loans from the government have been essential to enable the industry to re-equip itself.

A further problem was the public aversion in Thailand to eating locally caught fish, for fear that the fish have fed on human dead bodies which were swept out to sea by the tsunami. Thais found this possibility offensive both on health grounds and for religious reasons. Fish product distributors refused to buy fish and crustaceans from Andaman Sea ports, and preferred to buy from Gulf of Thailand ports or even from Malaysia or Vietnam, so that they could assure consumers that there was no possibility of such contamination. As a result, even those fishing families who were able to fish were unable to sell their catch. The Director-General of the World Health Organization, Dr Lee Jong-Wook, went on Thai television to say that he was eating fish every day.

In the long run the tsunami disaster brought considerable benefits to Thailand, especially the southern tourist areas. European governments have pledged large sums of money to rebuild infrastructure and to fund new schools and orphanages for the Thai communities affected, as a gesture of thanks for the assistance given to their citizens by the Thai people. The destruction of many second-rate structures along the beaches provided opportunities to rebuild popular tourist areas such as Patong Beach at Phuket in a more aesthetically and environmentally suitable way.

Thailand held legislative elections on 6 February 2005, and the tsunami disaster was drawn into the election campaign. Prime Minister Thaksin Shinawatra accused the former Democratic Party of Thailand government of Chuan Leekpai of ignoring warnings in 1998 of the possible risk of a tsunami affecting Thailand. His allegations were supported by the former head of the Meteorological Department, Smith Tumsaroch. Democratic Party politicians said that Smith has failed to produce any evidence for his warnings at the time, and accused Thaksin of politicising the tsunami tragedy.

References

External links
Photos before the destruction of Koh Phi Phi Island

Thailand
2004 in Thailand
Tsunamis in Thailand